The Vermont Housing Finance Agency (VHFA) is chartered as a private non-profit agency to finance and promote affordable housing opportunities for low- and moderate- income Vermonters. They are located in Burlington, Vermont.

History
The Vermont legislature established the agency in 1974.

By 2018, the VHFA had assisted approximately 29,000 people to purchase primary residences; and provided financing, development and management support, subsidy administration and tax credits for about 13,650 units of multifamily rental housing.

Operations
The board of directors has five members whom the Governor of Vermont appoints. There are also four "ex officio" members representing the finance and construction industry who also vote. The Executive Director is Maura Collins.

VHFA helps applicants with

 Single-family and homeownership mortgage financing programs
 Multifamily programs including:
Multifamily loan programs
Asset management and monitoring
Housing Assistance Payments contract administration
Federal and state Housing Tax Credit programs

VHFA reports housing data to responsible government agencies.

Financial
Since 1974, the agency has issued $2.96 billion worth of bonds and other financial instruments, of which $783.9 million was still outstanding at the end of the fiscal year ending June 30, 2010. Operating expenses were $4.6 million out of which $3.0 million were for personnel salaries and benefits.

Staffing
VHFA has about 40 employees. it issues tax-exempt bonds to fund its loan programs. It supports its operation out of the difference between what it gets for interest from its debtors and what it gets from lenders. The bonds are obligations of the agency and are underwritten by its loans.

Notes

External links
State Housing Agencies Get Caught in Credit Crunch
Forest Park banks on grants for revitalization
Tax credits aid Vermont home sales
National Homeownership Month program
Vermonters Struggle To Afford Renting a Home
Study shows recession makes Vermont’s housing problems harder to solve
Home prices out of reach for Vermonters (video)
Affordable Housing in Vermont (Video produced by the Vt Housing Awareness Campaign)
Pop Quiz: Sarah Carpenter
She’s got you covered - Magazine profile of Executive Director

Organizations based in Burlington, Vermont
Non-profit organizations based in Vermont
1974 establishments in Vermont
Affordable housing
Housing finance agencies of the United States
Housing organizations in the United States
Organizations established in 1974